Maryanne Chisholm  is a surrealist painter, NFT artist and illustrator, living in Tucson, USA.

Early Life/Career 
In 2005, Maryanne received a 27-year prison term for a crime that another man confessed to. She was imprisoned for 14 years before being freed after winning an appeal.

After more than ten years in the Perryville Women's Prison in Goodyear, Arizona, Maryanne Chisholm started painting. She served time in prison from 2005 to 2018 after being found guilty of white-collar offences. She started working in fine art after being released in 2018, and later used NFTs to support herself.

She found her calling while spending more than ten years in prison. She explains to Tony Paniagua how the Prison Arts Program gives women who are incarcerated inspiration and hope.

She used her art at the time to tell her narrative. Key paintings from her 5000 paintings are displayed at online websites. In order to tell a tale via art concerning justice reform and mental health, she has a dream to establish an exhibition called "While I Was Gone" that displays the 5000+ paintings, NFT's or whatever copies and originals are still available.

Maryanne explains about Web3 in terms of gender diversity, that Web3 is also lagging behind; according to the most recent study from cryptocurrency exchange Gemini, only 26% of Web3 investors are women.

References

External links 
 

Artists from Tucson, Arizona
Living people
Painting-related lists
Year of birth missing (living people)